The Convent of Saint-Hyacinth is a convent of the Dominican Order in Fribourg, in the Roman Catholic Diocese of Lausanne, Geneva and Fribourg.

See also
Catholicism in Switzerland

References

Buildings and structures in the canton of Fribourg